Calumet is a city in O'Brien County, Iowa, United States. The population was 146 at the 2020 census.

History
Calumet got its start circa 1887, following construction of the railroad through that territory.

Geography
Calumet is located at  (42.945988, -95.552078).

Demographics

2010 census
As of the census of 2010, there were 170 people, 75 households, and 50 families living in the city. The racial makeup of the city was 96.5% White and 3.5% African American. Hispanic or Latino of any race were 4.7% of the population.

There were 75 households, of which 26.7% had children under the age of 18 living with them, 54.7% were married couples living together, 5.3% had a female householder with no husband present, 6.7% had a male householder with no wife present, and 33.3% were non-families. 29.3% of all households were made up of individuals, and 12% had someone living alone who was 65 years of age or older. The average household size was 2.27 and the average family size was 2.74.

The median age in the city was 41.5 years. 21.2% of residents were under the age of 18; 8.8% were between the ages of 18 and 24; 23% were from 25 to 44; 31.1% were from 45 to 64; and 15.9% were 65 years of age or older. The gender makeup of the city was 52.4% male and 47.6% female.

2000 census
As of the census of 2000, there were 181 people, 77 households, and 51 families living in the city. The racial makeup of the city was 96.69% White, 0.55% African American, 0.55% Asian, and 2.21% from two or more races.

There were 77 households, out of which 26.0% had children under the age of 18 living with them, 61.0% were married couples living together, 3.9% had a female householder with no husband present, and 32.5% were non-families. 31.2% of all households were made up of individuals, and 18.2% had someone living alone who was 65 years of age or older. The average household size was 2.35 and the average family size was 2.94.

In the city, the population was spread out, with 25.4% under the age of 18, 5.5% from 18 to 24, 26.0% from 25 to 44, 23.2% from 45 to 64, and 19.9% who were 65 years of age or older. The median age was 39 years. For every 100 females, there were 101.1 males. For every 100 females age 18 and over, there were 101.5 males.

The median income for a household in the city was $33,750, and the median income for a family was $39,375. Males had a median income of $33,125 versus $16,250 for females. The per capita income for the city was $17,659. About 2.0% of families and 8.5% of the population were below the poverty line, including 6.4% of those under the age of eighteen and 25.0% of those 65 or over.

Education
Calumet is served by the South O'Brien Community School District. The district was formed on July 1, 1993 by the merger of three school districts: Paullina, Primghar, and Sutherland.

References

Cities in Iowa
Cities in O'Brien County, Iowa